Amédée Gaboury (March 26, 1838 – June 11, 1912) was a physician and political figure in Quebec. He represented Laval in the Legislative Assembly of Quebec from 1883 to 1884 as a Liberal.

He was born in Saint-Jean-Baptiste, Lower Canada, the son of Jean-Baptiste Gaboury and Rosalie Ayet dit Malo. He was educated at the Collège de Saint-Hyacinthe and the Victoria School of Medicine at Montreal. He qualified as a doctor in 1862 and set up practice at Saint-Martin. Martin was married twice: to Virginie Lavoie in 1873 and later to Rosalie Picard. He was elected in an 1883 by-election held after the election of Pierre-Évariste Leblanc was declared invalid. His election was overturned by the Quebec Superior Court in 1884 and he lost the subsequent by-election to Leblanc. He died in Saint-Martin at the age of 73.

His brother Tancrède-Charles also served in the Quebec assembly.

References
 

1838 births
1912 deaths
Quebec Liberal Party MNAs